Psalm 96 is the 96th psalm of the Book of Psalms, a hymn. The first verse of the psalm calls to praise in singing, in English in the King James Version: "O sing a new song unto the Lord". Similar to Psalm 98 ("Cantate Domino") and Psalm 149, the psalm calls to praise God in music and dance, because he has chosen his people and helped them to victory. It is one of the royal psalms praising God as the King of His people.

In the slightly different numbering system used by the Greek Septuagint and the Latin Vulgate, this psalm is Psalm 95.

The psalm forms a regular part of Jewish, Catholic, Lutheran, and Anglican liturgies. The Latin conclusion, "Laetentur caeli", is used during the Christmas night liturgy. The psalm or verses of it have been paraphrased to hymns, and it has often been set to music, notably by Handel in his Chandos Anthems, by Mendelssohn who quoted from it in a movement of his choral symphony Lobgesang, and Zoltán Gárdonyi as part of three motets.

Incipit: "O sing unto the LORD a new song: sing unto the LORD, all the earth." (KJV; in Hebrew ).

Background and themes
According to Radak, this psalm was composed by David when he brought the Ark of the Covenant up to Jerusalem. On this day, David composed two songs – Hodu, and "Sing to the Lord, the entire earth" (verse 2 of this psalm, which is also recorded in ). Hodu was sung before the Ark every morning, and Psalm 96 was sung before the Ark every afternoon, until the time the Temple was constructed and the Ark was moved into it. However, Alexander Kirkpatrick associates the "newness" of the song with the deliverance of Israel from Babylonian captivity, inaugurating "a new stage in the nation’s history". He notes that the Septuagint's title for this psalm is "When the house was being built after the Captivity".

In Hebrew, this psalm is known as Shiru Lashem ("Sing to the Lord"), and repeats the word "sing" three times. According to the Midrash Tehillim, these three instances allude to the three daily prayer services "when Israel sings praises to God". They are: Shacharit, the morning prayer, corresponding to "Sing a new song to the Lord" (verse 1); Mincha, the afternoon prayer, corresponding to "Sing to the Lord, all the earth" (verse 1); and Maariv, the evening prayer, corresponding to "Sing to the Lord, bless His Name" (verse 2).

In Baptist minister Charles Spurgeon's assessment, Psalm 96 is a "missionary hymn". It is specifically paired with Psalm 95, which described "Israel's hard-heartedness" toward God in the desert. Christian scholars assert that Israel employed that same hard-heartedness to reject Jesus as the Messiah, so now the Christians have the task of declaring the gospel to the world. Matthew Henry interprets verses 10 to 13 in this psalm as instructions of what to say for those who preach the gospel.

Biblical scholars note numerous thematic and structural similarities between Psalm 96 and Psalm 97, which are both "Kingship of YHWH" psalms.

Text

Hebrew Bible version
Following is the Hebrew text of Psalm 96:

King James Version
Declare his glory among the heathen, his wonders among all people. 
For all the gods of the nations are idols: but the  made the heavens. 
Honour and majesty are before him: strength and beauty are in his sanctuary. 
Give unto the  the glory due unto his name: bring an offering, and come into his courts. 
Say among the heathen that the  reigneth: the world also shall be established that it shall not be moved: he shall judge the people righteously. 
Let the heavens rejoice, and let the earth be glad; let the sea roar, and the fulness thereof. 
Let the field be joyful, and all that is therein: then shall all the trees of the wood rejoice 
Before the : for he cometh, for he cometh to judge the earth: he shall judge the world with righteousness, and the people with his truth.

Textual witnesses
Some early manuscripts containing the text of this chapter in Hebrew are of the Masoretic Text tradition, which includes the Aleppo Codex (10th century), and Codex Leningradensis (1008).

The extant palimpsest Aq includes a translation into Koine Greek by Aquila of Sinope in about 130 CE, containing verses 7–13.

Verse 1

Uses
Judaism
Psalm 96 is the second of six psalms recited during the Kabbalat Shabbat (Welcoming the Shabbat) service in Ashkenazic, Hasidic and some Sephardic communities.. These six psalms represent the six days of the week, with Psalm 96 corresponding to the second day of the week (Monday).

Verses 4 and 9 are part of Selichot.

Psalm 96 is recited to increase joy among family members.

Catholicism
The final three verses in Latin, "Laetentur caeli", comprise the offertory antiphon used in the Mass During the Night for the Nativity of the Lord.

 Musical settings 
Calling to sing, Psalm 96 has been paraphrased in hymns, and often set to music. "Laetentur caeli" (vv. 11–13 of the Psalm) was set by Orlande de Lassus for four parts, and by Giovanni Bassano for double choir, among others. Handel set the psalm around 1712, and a movement of his Chandos Anthems in 1717 or 1718. German settings of the Baroque era:
 Heinrich Schütz set Psalm 96 in German, "Singet dem Herrn ein neues Lied", for choir as part of his composition of the Becker Psalter, SWV 194.
 Singet dem Herrn ein neues Lied, previously attributed to Georg Philipp Telemann as TWV 1:1748, is Melchior Hoffmann's 1708 setting of Psalm 96, as a church cantata for New Year's Day.
 Telemann's Singet dem Herrn ein neues Lied, TWV 7:30 is a setting of Psalm 96.Georg Philipp Telemann – Catalogue TWV – 02–15: Cantates diverses – 07. Psaumes at  website.

In the 19th century, Mendelssohn quoted from Psalm 96 in movement 10 of his choral symphony Lobgesang on biblical texts in 1810. Czech composer Antonín Dvořák quoted the psalm, combined with verses of Psalm 98, in the final movement of his Biblical Songs'' of 1894.

In the 20th century, Zoltán Gárdonyi set Psalm 96 as part of three motets in German, "Singet dem Herren", for mixed choir a cappella, along with a Finnish song and Psalm 23, published by Schott. James MacMillan wrote "A New Song" in 1997, with lyrics taken from this Psalm.

Hymns referring to the psalm include the 1901 "This Is My Father's World", and "Sing to the Lord a new made song". Music inspired by the psalm also includes a gospel blues by Blind Willie Johnson, "Church, I'm Fully Saved To-Day", based on the hymn "Fully Saved Today".

References

Sources

External links 

 
 
 Text of Psalm 96 according to the 1928 Psalter
 Psalms Chapter 96 text in Hebrew and English, mechon-mamre.org
 Sing to the LORD a new song; / sing to the LORD, all the earth. text and footnotes, usccb.org United States Conference of Catholic Bishops
 Psalm 96:1 introduction and text, biblestudytools.com
 Psalm 96 – Declaring the Glory of God to the Entire World enduringword.com
 Psalm 96 / Refrain: O worship the Lord in the beauty of holiness. Church of England
 Psalm 96 at biblegateway.com
 A tune for Kabbalat Shabbat, on the Zemirot Database
 Psalm 96 Christian Sermon

096